Shavar (also Romanized as Shavār) is a village in Pian Rural District, in the Central District of Izeh County, Khuzestan Province, Iran. At the 2006 census, its population was 195, in 35 families.

References 

Populated places in Izeh County